Libertatea (lit. Liberty) is leading Romanian language weekly newspaper in Serbia published in Pančevo, in the autonomous province of Vojvodina. The newspaper was established in 1945 after the end of World War II in Yugoslavia.

While originally established by the Autonomous Province of Vojvodina the region transferred all rights and responsibilities to the National Council of the Romanian National Minority in 2004.

History
The newspaper was established in 1945 while the transfer of rights happened in 2004. In 2018 newspaper was awarded the Ordinul "Meritul Cultural" by the President of Romania Klaus Iohannis.

2020 management board dismissal controversy
In February 2020 telephone session the National Council of the Romanian National Minority dismissed the Management Board and appointed new members of that body. The 20 staff members of the newspaper's publishing house (including the director Niku Čobanu) strongly condemned the action of the Romanian National Council. The decision was criticized by the League of Social Democrats of Vojvodina as an attempt to turn Libertatea into a bulletin of the ruling Serbian Progressive Party (SNS). The decision was criticized by the opposition Alliance for Serbia as well.

See also
 Romanians of Serbia
 Romanian language in Serbia
 Magyar Szó

References

External links
Official website 

Romanians in Serbia
Romanian-language newspapers
Newspapers published in Serbia
Publications with year of establishment missing
Mass media in Pančevo